Four cable-laying ships have been named CS Alert:
 , built 1871 as The Lady Carmichael for the Submarine Telegraph Company, taken over by the GPO in 1890 and renamed Alert, cable equipment removed 1915 and ship sold on.
 , built 1918, sunk by torpedo 1945.
 , built 1915 as an oil tanker named Nordenay, converted to a cable ship for the German navy 1922, given to the GPO as war reparations in 1945 and renamed Alert, scrapped 1960.
 , built 1961 for the GPO.

See also
 Alert (disambiguation), for other ships named Alert

References 

Ship names